Calamus jenkinsianus is an Asian species of rattan in the family Arecaceae and the tribe Calameae; it is widely known under its synonym Daemonorops jenkinsiana.  It has been recorded from: Assam, Bangladesh, Cambodia, China Southeast, East Himalaya, Hainan, Laos, Myanmar, Taiwan, Thailand and Vietnam, (where it is called mây rút).

Uses
The seeds of species such as C. jenkinsianus (Chinese: 星月菩提) are harvested for the production of Buddhist prayer beads.

References

External Links 
 
 

jenkinsianus
Flora of Indo-China